Qanatghestan (also Romanized as Qanātghestān and Qanāt-e-Ghestan; also known as Kanakistān and Qalāt Ghestān) is a village in Qanatghestan Rural District, Mahan District, Kerman County, Kerman Province, Iran. At the 2006 census, its population was 902, in 249 families.

References 

Populated places in Kerman County